The dihydrogen cation or hydrogen molecular ion is a cation (positive ion) with formula . It consists of two hydrogen nuclei (protons) sharing a single electron. It is the simplest molecular ion.

The ion can be formed from the ionization of a neutral hydrogen molecule . It is commonly formed in molecular clouds in space, by the action of cosmic rays.

The dihydrogen cation is of great historical and theoretical interest because, having only one electron, the equations of quantum mechanics that describe its structure can be solved in a relatively straightforward way. The first such solution was derived by Ø. Burrau in 1927, just one year after the wave theory of quantum mechanics was published.

Physical properties

Bonding in  can be described as a covalent one-electron bond, which has a formal bond order of one half.

The ground state energy of the ion is -0.597 Hartree.

Isotopologues
The dihydrogen cation has six isotopologues, that result from replacement of one or more protons by nuclei of the other hydrogen isotopes; namely, deuterium nuclei (deuterons) or tritium nuclei (tritons).

  =  (the common one).
  =   (deuterium hydrogen cation).
  =   (dideuterium cation).
  =   (tritium hydrogen cation). 
  =   (tritium deuterium cation). 
  =   (ditritium cation).

Quantum mechanical analysis
The Schrödinger equation (in the clamped-nuclei approximation) for this cation can be solved in a relatively straightforward way due to the lack of electron–electron repulsion (electron correlation). The analytical solutions for the electronic energy eigenvalues are a generalization of the Lambert W function which can be obtained using a computer algebra system  within an experimental mathematics approach.  Consequently, it is included as an example in most quantum chemistry textbooks.

Earlier attempts using the old quantum theory had been published in 1922 by Karel Niessen and Wolfgang Pauli, and in 1925 by Harold Urey. In 1928, Linus Pauling published a review putting together the work of Burrau with the work of Walter Heitler and Fritz London on the hydrogen molecule.

Clamped-nuclei (Born–Oppenheimer) approximation
The electronic Schrödinger wave equation for the hydrogen molecular ion  with two fixed nuclear centers, labeled A and B, and one electron can be written as

where V is the electron-nuclear Coulomb potential energy function:

and E is the (electronic) energy of a given quantum mechanical state (eigenstate), with the electronic state function ψ = ψ(r) depending on the spatial coordinates of the electron. An additive term , which is constant for fixed internuclear distance R, has been omitted from the potential V, since it merely shifts the eigenvalue. The distances between the electron and the nuclei are denoted ra and rb. In atomic units (ħ = m = e = 4ε0 = 1) the wave equation is

We choose the midpoint between the nuclei as the origin of coordinates. It follows from general symmetry principles that the wave functions can be characterized by their symmetry behavior with respect to the point group inversion operation i (r ↦ −r). There are wave functions ψg(r), which are symmetric with respect to i, and there are wave functions ψu(r), which are antisymmetric under this symmetry operation:

The suffixes g and u are from the German gerade and ungerade) occurring here denote the symmetry behavior under the point group inversion operation i. Their use is standard practice for the designation of electronic states of diatomic molecules, whereas for atomic states the terms even and odd are used. There is also the first excited state A2Σ (2pσu), which is ungerade.  

Asymptotically, the (total) eigenenergies Eg/u for these two lowest lying states have the same asymptotic expansion in inverse powers of the internuclear distance R:

The actual difference between these two energies is called the exchange energy splitting and is given by:

which exponentially vanishes as the internuclear distance R gets greater.  The lead term  was first obtained by the Holstein–Herring method.  Similarly, asymptotic expansions in powers of  have been obtained to high order by Cizek et al. for the lowest ten discrete states of the hydrogen molecular ion (clamped nuclei case). For general diatomic and polyatomic molecular systems, the exchange energy is thus very elusive to calculate at large internuclear distances but is nonetheless needed for long-range interactions including studies related to magnetism and charge exchange effects. These are of particular importance in stellar and atmospheric physics.

The energies for the lowest discrete states are shown in the graph above.  These can be obtained to within arbitrary accuracy using computer algebra from the generalized Lambert W function (see eq. (3) in that site and the reference of Scott, Aubert-Frécon, and Grotendorst) but were obtained initially by numerical means to within double precision by the most precise program available, namely ODKIL. The red solid lines are 2Σ states.  The green dashed lines are 2Σ states. The blue dashed line is a 2Πu state and the pink dotted line is a 2Πg state.  Note that although the generalized Lambert W function eigenvalue solutions supersede these asymptotic expansions, in practice, they are most useful near the bond length.  These solutions are possible because the partial differential equation of the wave equation here separates into two coupled ordinary differential equations using prolate spheroidal coordinates.

The nuclear hyperfine Hamiltonian can mix the rotational levels of g and u electronic states (called ortho-para mixing) and give
rise to ortho-para transitions

Occurrence in space

Formation
The dihydrogen ion is formed in nature by the interaction of cosmic rays and the hydrogen molecule.  An electron is knocked off leaving the cation behind.
H2 + cosmic ray →  + e− + cosmic ray.
Cosmic ray particles have enough energy to ionize many molecules before coming to a stop.

The ionization energy of the hydrogen molecule is 15.603 eV. High speed electrons also cause ionization of hydrogen molecules with a peak cross section around 50 eV.

An artificial plasma discharge cell can also produce the ion.

Destruction
In nature the ion is destroyed by reacting with other hydrogen molecules:
 + H2 →  + H.

See also
 Symmetry of diatomic molecules
 Dirac Delta function model (one-dimensional version of )
 Di-positronium
 Euler's three-body problem (classical counterpart)
 Few-body systems
 Helium atom
 Helium hydride ion
 Trihydrogen cation
 Triatomic hydrogen
 Lambert W function
 Molecular astrophysics
 Holstein–Herring method
 Three-body problem
 List of quantum-mechanical systems with analytical solutions

References

Hydrogen physics
Cations
Quantum chemistry
Quantum models